Rayani Air Sdn. Bhd.  (doing business as Rayani Air; Jawi:) was a full-service airline in Malaysia, headquartered in Shah Alam, Selangor, in the Kuala Lumpur metropolitan area. It was the first Sharia-compliant airline in Malaysia and the fourth such airline in the world, after Royal Brunei Airlines (RBA), Saudi Arabian Airlines and Iran Air. No alcoholic beverages or pork were served on board in accordance with Islamic dietary laws and prayers were recited before every flight. It was forced to cease operations after only five months due to management, safety and security issues, pilot strikes, and lack of funding.

History

Rayani Air was founded by Ravi Alagendrran and his wife Karthiyani Govindan, both of Malaysian Indian descent. The name Rayani is said to be a combination of the first names of the founders.

Rayani Airlines was originally intended to be based at Malacca International Airport, with its inaugural flight expected to take place in August 2014. However, the airline changed its base to Langkawi International Airport to attract tourists to the resort island. It was previously rumoured that Rayani Air would be launched as a low-cost carrier; however, the airline officially positioned itself as a full-service carrier in December 2015.

On 20 December 2015, the airline's inaugural flight to Langkawi (RN600) took off smoothly.

The airline was planning to co-operate with Royal Brunei Airlines to strengthen the Sharia-compliant airline concept within the aviation industry.

On 9 April 2016, Rayani Air temporarily suspended all operations until further notice, citing 'restructuring exercises' in an announcement made by its co-founder.

The Malaysian Aviation Commission (Mavcom) announced in a statement on 13 June 2016 that Rayani Air's licence had been revoked, saying it had breached the conditions of its licence and lacked the financial and management capacity to continue operating as a commercial airline.

Former Destinations
 Kuala Lumpur - Kuala Lumpur International Airport (Main Hub)
 Langkawi – Langkawi International Airport
 Kota Bharu – Sultan Ismail Petra Airport
 Kuching – Kuching International Airport
 Kota Kinabalu – Kota Kinabalu International Airport

Fleet
Before ceasing operations, the airline's fleet consisted of two Boeing 737-400 aircraft, with the following on order: two more Boeing 737-400s, four Boeing 737-800s and two Boeing 777-200s.

Accidents and incidents
 On 9 February 2016, Rayani Air flight RN180 scheduled for Kuala Lumpur International Airport 2 was cancelled due to a broken cockpit windshield. The next day, the airline issued a press statement apologising for the flight cancellation, and attributed the shattered windshield to a previous night flight. Rayani Air said they were investigating to see whether the broken windshield was an act of sabotage, and would liaise with relevant authorities to deal with this.

 In March 2016, Rayani Air faced several issues and numerous complaints, highlighted in several media outlets. Passengers complained that the airline frequently rescheduled flights, often up to 13 hours later. The airline also frequently cancelled flights without advance notice and without compensation or assistance to affected passengers. It was reported that pilots refused to fly because of the poor condition of the aircraft.
 Politician Lau Weng San criticised the airline for using handwritten boarding passes, posing a security threat to the aviation industry. This led the Minister of Transport Liow Tiong Lai to state that the airline would be investigated and suspended if necessary. On 11 April 2016, Rayani Air was officially suspended for 3 months. Its licence was permanently revoked two months later.

References

External links
 
 

Defunct airlines of Malaysia
Airlines established in 2015
Airlines disestablished in 2016
2015 establishments in Malaysia
2016 disestablishments in Malaysia